Valcourt is a town in Quebec in Le Val-Saint-François Regional County Municipality in the Estrie region of Quebec.

The town is accessible via Quebec Route 222.

Toponymy 
The town of Valcourt is enclaved by Valcourt (township). The name of Valcourt makes reference to the origin of this township.

The origins of Valcourt go back to 1802, the year where the first inhabitants came to establish themselves in the township of Ely, named after the city in Great Britain. The first inhabitants were Loyalists, but by 1840 Canadiens began to arrive in the area. The first parish was created in 1856, and a civil entity in 1865 under the name of Township of Ely. The official name of Valcourt was not given until 1965, and took the name of the post office and the railroad station belonging to the Canadian Pacific Railway.

Many hypotheses exist as to the naming of Valcourt. The first is situated in the fact that a small valley in French would be a val court. The second is the deformation of a certain family name between 1849 and 1850 of Dalcourt. The last hypothesis is the existence of a village in the United States by the name of Valcour, situated just south of the border with Canada and the state of New York.

Demographics 

Mother tongue (2011)

Famous people 
The inventor of the snowmobile, Joseph-Armand Bombardier, was born in Valcourt.

Tourist attractions 

The J. Armand Bombardier museum is situated on the territory of the municipality. The main theme of the museum is the interpretation of the history of the snowmobile industry and of its inventor, Joseph-Armand Bombardier. The museum also houses three exhibition halls and a temporary exhibition hall.

See also
List of cities in Quebec

References

External links 
 Site officiel
 Grand Prix Ski-Doo de Valcourt

Cities and towns in Quebec
Incorporated places in Estrie